CBI is an Indian Malayalam-language film series of mystery films directed by K. Madhu and written by S. N. Swamy featuring Mammootty as Sethurama Iyer, a Central Bureau of Investigation (CBI) officer in the title role. The series started off in 1988 with Oru CBI Diary Kurippu. The character Sethurama Iyer is said to have been inspired by a police officer named Radha Vinod Raju, who in 2009 was appointed as the first chief of India's National Investigation Agency.

Films 
The films depicts a team of three CBI officers led by Sethurama Iyer investigating into a murder case. All the films feature Mammootty as Sethurama Iyer. The other two members of the team vary in the series. All the four films so far released have Vikram, the character played by Jagathy Sreekumar as a CBI officer. But he is not part of the three-men team in the third film and fifth film but appears in the films for a short length. Chacko played by Mukesh appears in the first film but is not part of the team. But Chacko becomes part of the team from the second film onwards. Harry played by Suresh Gopi is present in the first movie as part of the team, but later transferred to Madras in the second sequel.

The films of the franchise are:

Sethurama Iyer (Malayalam: സേതുരാമയ്യര്‍) is a fictional character and the protagonist of the CBI film series. The character was played by Mammootty in all the films. He is an investigative officer of the Central Bureau of Investigation (CBI). Iyer's popularity is attributed to the fact that he uses his brain rather than brawn to solve cases.

Timeline

Cast and characters

References 

Central Bureau of Investigation in fiction
Film series introduced in 1988
CBI
CBI
CBI